The women's 400 metre freestyle event at the 2010 Asian Games took place on 15 November 2010 at Guangzhou Aoti Aquatics Centre.

There were 12 competitors from 8 countries who took part in this event. Two heats were held, the heat in which a swimmer competed did not formally matter for advancement, as the swimmers with the top eight times from the entire field qualified for the finals.

Shao Yiwen and Liu Jing from China won the gold and silver medal respectively, South Korean swimmer Seo Youn-jeong won the bronze medal.

Schedule
All times are China Standard Time (UTC+08:00)

Records

Results

Heats

Final

References

 16th Asian Games Results

External links 
 Women's 400m Freestyle Heats Official Website
 Women's 400m Freestyle Ev.No.15 Final Official Website

Swimming at the 2010 Asian Games